Juan Gabriel Bustos Golobio (born 9 July 1992) is a Costa Rican professional footballer who plays as a midfielder.

International career 
Bustos made his international debut against Nicaragua and scored his first goal against Guatemela.

International goals

References

External links 
 

1992 births
Living people
Association football midfielders
Costa Rican footballers
Liga FPD players
Deportivo Saprissa players
C.S. Cartaginés players
C.S. Herediano footballers
A.D. San Carlos footballers
Costa Rica under-20 international footballers
Costa Rica international footballers
2014 Copa Centroamericana players
Copa Centroamericana-winning players
Footballers from San José, Costa Rica